Dalila Bela (born October 5, 2001) is a Canadian-American actress who is known for her role as Agent Olive on the TVOKids/PBS series Odd Squad (2014–2015), in films such as Diary of a Wimpy Kid (2012), and work on television shows such as Once Upon a Time (2015) and Anne with an E (2017–2019).

Personal life
Dalila Bela was born in Montreal, Quebec. She is of English, French, Brazilian, Panamanian and Spanish ancestry. Her father is from Panama, and her mother is from Brazil.  She has two younger brothers named Bruce and Raphael, who are also actors. She currently lives in Los Angeles, California.

Career
Bela began her career in acting at the age of five when she first appeared on a national commercial. A year later, she won Best Actor of the Year, and moved with her family to Vancouver. Following her move, she won the Young Artist Award for best performance in a direct to video movie, entitled The Stranger. In both 2011 and 2012, she was awarded the Young Artist Award for her work in Joanna Makes a Friend.

Bela won the 2015 Joey Awards for Best Young Ensemble in a TV Series for her starring role in Odd Squad, sharing the award with her Odd Squad co-stars. Additionally, she has received accolades for her role of Lola Littleton in Dead Hearts at the Diabolique Film Festival Award.

She portrayed Diana Barry in the series by CBC/Netflix, Anne with an E, based on the book Anne of Green Gables.

Filmography

Films

Television

Awards and nominations

References

External links
 

2001 births
Living people
Actresses from Montreal
Anglophone Quebec people
Canadian people of English descent
Canadian people of Brazilian descent
Canadian people of French descent
Canadian people of Spanish descent
Canadian people of Panamanian descent
Canadian LGBT actors
Jewish Canadian actresses
Canadian child actresses
Canadian film actresses
Canadian television actresses
Pansexual actresses
Actresses of Brazilian descent
21st-century Canadian actresses
Canadian expatriate actresses in the United States
21st-century Canadian LGBT people